Lorenzo Cherubini (born 27 September 1966), better known as Jovanotti, is an Italian singer-songwriter, rapper and disc jockey.

The name Jovanotti derives from giovanotti, the plural form of the Italian word giovanotto ("young man"). Cherubini initially chose "Joe Vanotti" as his stage name, but a promotional poster for a night club incorrectly billed him as "Jovanotti" and the name stuck. (The spelling Jovanotti is anglicized; the letter J is rarely used in Italian) Jovanotti is commonly known to his fans by the diminutive form "Jova", and often refers to himself that way in promotional items and on his Web TV channel Jova.TV, which launched 2 October 2014.

Jovanotti gradually departed from his early mix of hip hop, rap and disco, taking in funk, world music and even classical arrangements and ska influences. As his musical influences changed, so did his lyrics too, which over time began to increasingly address philosophical, religious and political issues, which are more typical of the Italian cantautore tradition. His social and political commitment increased as well. Some of his earlier work is also closer to keyboard-heavy 1980s pop.

Most of his songs are sung in Italian; he also released a Spanish-language greatest hits album. His live album includes a short version of the Sugarhill Gang's "Rapper's Delight."  Jovanotti appears on several international compilations, most notably  Red Hot + Rhapsody, a 1998 tribute to George Gershwin, on which he performed "I Got Rhythm". Jovanotti also appeared in one of Luciano Pavarotti's charity concerts in 1996.

Biography

Early life 
Cherubini was born on 27 September 1966 in Rome to Tuscan parents, Mario and Viola Cardinali, but he spent part of his childhood in his parents' hometown, Cortona, in the province of Arezzo (Tuscany).

After completing his high-school studies, he started working as a disc jockey in several discothèques and radio stations in the province of Rome. 
In 1985 he moved to Milan. Two years later, during the summer of 1987, while he was playing a DJ set in Palinuro, he met the record producer and talent scout Claudio Cecchetto, who proposed they begin working together. That same year Jovanotti released his first single, "Walking," and started working as a DJ for one of the most prominent national radio stations, Radio DeeJay, which was founded by Cecchetto five years earlier.

Career breakthrough: 1980s and 1990s 
His first studio album, Jovanotti for President, was released in 1988 and became the symbol of the Italian youth of the eighties, without any interest in ideologies and politics. Despite receiving strongly negative criticism, the album became a big commercial success, reaching the third position on the Italian Musica e dischi Albums Chart and selling over 400,000 copies in Italy. Moreover, the album spawned five singles, including the number-one hits, "Gimme Five" (also the name of his British TV show for Janet Street Porter's DEF II youth TV block on BBC Two) and "Gimme Five (Rasta Five)" and the songs "Go Jovanotti Go" and "Mix, Remix & The singers," which entered the Italian top 5.

In 1998, Jovanotti played a brief role in the movie I Giardini dell'Eden, directed by Alessandro D'Alatri.

The song "Piove" was released for the second season of The Sopranos as an ending credits track.

2000s 
His 2005 CD, Buon Sangue, was influenced by both rock and old school hip hop. It is one of his most innovative works to date. Edoardo Bennato collaborated on one track, while bass player Saturnino co-wrote two of the songs.

In 2007 he was featured at the end of Negramaro's song, "Cade la Pioggia," of their CD, La Finestra, and in 2008 he released the new album Safari.

In 2008 he performed as guest artist on the track "Lugar Comum" from the album Encanto. At the end of 2009, he collaborated with Claudio Baglioni and Fabrizio Bosso, along with 70 other artists, in the song "Con tutto il mio cuore (with All My Heart)." On 1 January 2010 the group released "Baciami Ancora (Kiss Me Again)" for the soundtrack of a film by Gabriele Muccino.

2010s 
In December 2010 he achieved a number one hit on the Italian Top 20 charts with "Tutto l'amore che ho." On 25 January 2011, he released his eighteenth album Ora. Later in 2011 he played at the Bonnaroo Music Festival.

Commitment 
Along with the evolution of his sound, his social and political commitment for mainstream causes has increased since the 1990s. As a convinced pacifist, he frequently worked with organizations such as Make Poverty History, Amnesty International, and he has contributed to events dedicated to debt relief (Global Call to Action Against Poverty).

Jovanotti has a friendship with Bono due to their mutual quest for the cancellation of foreign debt in poor African countries. He also collaborated with Michael Franti of Spearhead on his Capo Horn and Ora albums. Both Michael Franti and U2 misspelled his name as Giovanotti in the liner note credits.

Television 
Even though Jovanotti has never had a UK chart hit under his own name, he was briefly known in the United Kingdom as the presenter of the DEF II programme Gimme 5. The show, which featured a brief introduction each week by Jovanotti, showcased youth television programmes from around the world.

In 2020 he released exclusively for RaiPlay the documentary in sixteen episodes "Non voglio cambiare Pianeta" (I don't want to change Planet) which he filmed whilst travelling from Chile to Argentina on his bicycle, between January and February 2020.

Gino Latino 
Jovanotti was behind one of two rival Gino Latino italo house tracks in the early 1990s. His Gino Latino single, "Welcome", reached number 17 on the UK Singles Chart.

Personal life 
On 6 September 2008, Jovanotti married Francesca Valiani at Cortona, in the Church of Santa Maria Nuova. Their daughter Teresa was born in 1998. He dedicated the lullaby "Per te" to Teresa, one of the hits of the album Capo Horn (1999), and the song "Libera" from the album Lorenzo 2015 cc.

Discography 

Studio albums
 Jovanotti for President (1988)
 La mia moto (1989)
 Giovani Jovanotti (1990)
 Una tribù che balla (1991)
 Lorenzo 1992 (1992)
 Lorenzo 1994 (1994)
 Lorenzo 1997 - L'albero (1997)
 Lorenzo 1999 - Capo Horn (1999)
 Lorenzo 2002 - Il quinto mondo (2002)
 Buon sangue (2005)
 Safari (2008)
 Ora (2011)
 Lorenzo 2015 CC. (2015)
 Oh, Vita! (2017)
 Jova Beach Party (2019)
 Lorenzo sulla luna (2019)
 Il disco del Sole (2022)

Filmography

Awards and nominations

Bibliography
 Yo, brothers and sisters. Siamo o non siamo un bel movimento?, Milano, Vallardi, 1988.
 Cherubini, S.l., Soleluna, 1993.
 Il grande boh!, Milano, Feltrinelli, 1998. ISBN 88-07-70102-2; Milano, Feltrinelli, 2000. ISBN 88-07-81604-0
 Quarantology, 1966-2006, Milano, Rizzoli, 2006. ISBN 88-17-01165-7
 La parrucca di Mozart, Torino, Einaudi, 2009. ISBN 978-88-06-20054-1
 Per te, Roma, Gallucci, 2009. ISBN 978-88-6145-086-8
 Viva tutto!, Add Editore, 2010. ISBN 978-88-96873-18-2
 Gratitude, Torino, Einaudi, 2013. ISBN 978-88-06-21834-8
 Sbam!, Milano, Mondadori, 2017. ISBN 978-88-04-68543-2

References

External links

  
 Interview and music videos of Jovanotti in performance in San Francisco on PBS "Sound Tracks presents Quick Hits"
 Aliases

1966 births
Living people
Singers from Rome
People from Cortona
Italian male singer-songwriters
Italian rappers
Hip hop singers
World Music Awards winners
Italian pop singers
20th-century Italian  male singers
21st-century Italian male  singers
Italian radio personalities
Folk-pop singers